Sahdeokhap is a village in Gaya district, Bihar, India, 20 km from district headquarters, and only 10 km from well known pilgrim destination Bodhgaya. Sahdeokhap is one of the most developed villages in Gaya district.one km away the third biggest powergrid of the Asia. population depends mainly on agriculture to make a living. Majority of people are pathans( which is a Muslim tribe from Afghan).  Muslim & Hindu people stay in the village. There are several schools, a hospital, a bank, a post office and a playground.

 

Cities and towns in Gaya district